John Rankin Rathbone (5 February 1910 – 10 December 1940) was a British Conservative Party politician.

Early life 
He was born in 1910 to William Rathbone, a marine architect, and Agnes Dorothea Rankin.

Education 
For his education, Rathbone attended West Downs and Eton College before attending Christ Church, Oxford.

Whilst up at Oxford, he met an American student, Beatrice Frederika Clough, who had come to study at the university. The couple married in 1932 and had two children, a son, John Rankin Rathbone (known as Tim) and a daughter, Pauline Rathbone.

Political career 
From the 1935 general election until his death, he was Member of Parliament (MP) for the Bodmin constituency in Cornwall. After his death, his American-born wife Beatrice was elected unopposed to succeed him as MP. The family lived in the constituency at Elmsleigh.

Foreign travel

United States 

Germany 

Rathbone travelled as part of a parliamentary delegation, accompanied by Beatrice, to Nazi Germany. A fluent German speaker, he was appalled at what he saw in the country as he participated in the work of the delegation.

He was a qualified pilot, learning to fly with the Old Etonian Flying Club and getting his Avro Club membership on 19 May 1938. Upon returning from Germany, Rathbone called a meeting in his constituency to announce that he was joining the Royal Air Force Volunteer Reserve.

Second World War 
He served as Parliamentary Secretary to the Ministry of Supply from July to September 1939, when World War II broke out. A flight lieutenant and fighter pilot with the Royal Air Force, he was killed shortly after the Battle of Britain, on 10 September 1940. He was buried at Schoonselhof cemetery, Antwerp, Belgium.

In his obituary in The Times observed

Family members 
Rathbone was the nephew of Eleanor Rathbone, who had been an independent MP for the Combined English Universities between 1929 and 1946, and a staunch women's rights campaigner. He was a grandson of William Rathbone, Liberal MP for Liverpool and later Carnarvonshire.

His son, also called John Rankin Rathbone, but known as Tim Rathbone, was the Conservative MP for Lewes from 1974 to 1997.

His younger brother, Henry Stephen Nicholas Rathbone, served as a Captain in the Scots Guards and was killed at Monte Cassino on 9 November 1943.

References

External links 

 

1910 births
1940 deaths
Royal Air Force officers
Conservative Party (UK) MPs for English constituencies
UK MPs 1935–1945
Members of the Parliament of the United Kingdom for Bodmin
Royal Air Force pilots of World War II
Royal Air Force personnel killed in World War II
Politicians from Cornwall
John
Royal Air Force Volunteer Reserve personnel of World War II
British World War II fighter pilots